North Padre Island is a barrier island along the coast of Texas. It and South Padre Island were formed after the creation of the Port Mansfield Channel split Padre Island in two. From north to south, North Padre Island is located in parts of Nueces, Kleberg, Kenedy, and Willacy counties. The northernmost part of the island to the Kleberg County line is part of the city of Corpus Christi.

Corpus Christi
The upper portion of North Padre Island is a district of the city of Corpus Christi. "The Island" as known by locals consists of high-income residential housing and condominiums and is a popular fishing destination. The Packery Channel, an inlet which connects the Gulf of Mexico to the Laguna Madre, separates 
North Padre Island from Mustang Island. There are numerous hotels located on North Padre Island, either along the beach or near the intersection of Texas Highway 361 and Texas Park Road 22, the district's two only main thoroughfares. Boating is also a popular activity on the island as the residential neighborhoods are connected by a series of canals which lead to the Gulf of Mexico.

See also
Padre Island
South Padre Island
Padre Island National Seashore

External links
 

Landforms of Corpus Christi, Texas
Landforms of Kenedy County, Texas
Landforms of Kleberg County, Texas
Islands of Nueces County, Texas
Landforms of Willacy County, Texas
Barrier islands of Texas